The Hushan Temple is a temple in Huatan Township, Changhua County, Taiwan. It enshrines Guanyin Bodhisattva.

History
In 1725 during the Qianlong Emperor, the temple constructed. The temple was then built on the land of Lai Feng-kao.

See also
 Buddhism in Taiwan
 Baozang Temple
 Kaihua Temple
 Lukang Longshan Temple
 List of temples in Taiwan
 List of tourist attractions in Taiwan

References

External links

 

1725 establishments in Taiwan
Buddhist temples in Taiwan
Huatan Township
Religious buildings and structures completed in 1725
Temples in Changhua County